Latifa Lakhdar (born 1 February 1956) is a Tunisian historian and politician who was Minister of Culture from February 2015 until January 2016.

Early life and education
Lakhdar was born in Zarzis on 1 February 1956. She was a student of Mohamed Arkoun at the Sorbonne in Paris.

Career
Lakhdar was Professor of Contemporary History at University of Ez-Zitouna from 1991 to 1999 and from 2000 to 2015 at the University of Tunis.

Lakhdar is an expert in Islamic thought and has published several books in Arabic and French, notably on the condition of women in Islamic societies. She is a women's rights activist and secularist. She has argued that Islamic fundamentalism, including Islamic terrorism is part of Islamic orthodoxy, but that Islamic thought can be enlightened and liberal if it undergoes a "critical revolution". She argues that "The jihadist idea that religion should rule politics is a model that never existed."

Political career
Lakhdar is a founding member of the Association tunisienne des femmes démocrates. In 2011, she was elected Vice-President of the Higher Authority for Realisation of the Objectives of the Revolution, Political Reform and Democratic Transition.

On 6 February 2015, Lakhdar was appointed Minister of Culture and Heritage Preservation, as an independent, in the government of Prime Minister Habib Essid. She was in communication with museum staff during the Bardo National Museum attack on 18 March 2015 and later unveiled a memorial at the site.

On 12 February 2016, Lakhdar was made a Commander of the Order of the Republic by President Béji Caïd Essebsi for her service.

Publications

Books

Articles

References

Living people
1956 births
Historians of Tunisia
College of Sorbonne alumni
Academic staff of the University of Ez-Zitouna
Academic staff of Tunis University
Tunisian feminists
People of the Tunisian Revolution
Government ministers of Tunisia
Women government ministers of Tunisia
21st-century Tunisian women politicians
21st-century Tunisian politicians
Women historians
20th-century Tunisian historians
21st-century Tunisian historians
20th-century Tunisian women writers
21st-century Tunisian women writers